Colonel Frederick William Gadsby Annand  (7 May 1872 – 22 June 1958) was an Australian businessman and soldier.

Early life 
Annand was born at Toowoomba on 7 May 1872 to rural worker James Annand and Harriet, née Gadsby. He attended local state schools.

Business career 
Annand worked for the Australian Mutual Provident Society and on stations in the Warrego region. In 1895 he formed an agency in Toowoomba and in 1899 established an accounting form, gaining a licence as an auditor. On 1 June 1898 he married Helen Alice Robinson. In 1905 he was appointed to manage the Brisbane Permanent Building and Banking Company (which would become the Bank of Queensland), which he restored to profit.

Military career 
In 1897 he had joined the Queensland Defence Force, becoming a lieutenant with the Mounted Infantry. He joined the Royal Australian Engineers in 1905 and was promoted captain of the 5th Field Company; in 1911 he became a major with the 3rd Field Company. During the First World War he commanded the 7th Field Company and was promoted lieutenant colonel in March 1916, after which he commanded the 2nd Australian Pioneer Battalion. Mentioned in despatches four times and awarded a Distinguished Service Order (December 1916) and Bar (October 1918), he returned from the war to command the Citizen Military Force's 15th Battalion. Promoted to colonel in 1926, he retired from active service in May 1932.

Public life 
A councillor and mayor (1924) of Hamilton, in 1925 Annand was appointed town clerk of Greater Brisbane. He resigned in 1931 in frustration after disputes with A. E. Moore's government and returned to the Building and Banking Company, of which he was elected director. He was president of the local Young Men's Christian Association, the Brisbane Rotary Club and deacon of the City Congregational Church.

Later life 
Annand died on 22 June 1958 at Ascot. He was buried in a family grave at Toowong Cemetery on 23 June 1958. His son Douglas Annand was a well-known artist.

Legacy 
Frederick Annand Park at 53 Milburn Street at Chermside West was named after him.

References

1872 births
1958 deaths
Military personnel from Queensland
Australian colonels
Australian bankers
Australian military personnel of World War I
Australian Companions of the Distinguished Service Order
People from Toowoomba
Australian military engineers
Burials in Queensland